Robert Sands (September 15, 1943 –) is an accomplished designer, painter and director from Pittsburgh, Pennsylvania. He studied painting and design at the Ivy School of Professional Art under Abe Weiner, Marie Kelly, Roy Hunter, and Everett Sturgeon.

Robert is the owner and founder of Terminal Graphics; a Pittsburgh-based design firm recognized both locally and internationally. His company specializes in imaginative and vibrant sets, lighting designs, large-scale entertainment presentations, advertising campaigns, electronic graphics and video/web productions. Robert’s designs have been procured by such clients as: Wired Magazine, Allstate Insurance Company, GE Capital, The Ford Motor Company, National Baseball Hall of Fame, and the H.J. Heinz Company.

Aside from his interests in graphic design, Robert's private life is spent as a painter and fine artist.  Most of his graphic designs even, have begun as hand-rendered images in acrylics, pastels, or pencil. In the 1990s, advancements in computer graphic design allowed for new adjustments to old renderings, and he embraced the computer as tool in advancing the possibilities of his work.

References 

1943 births
Artists from Pittsburgh
Living people